Ayala was a British-bred racehorse who competed in National Hunt racing.

He is best known for winning the 1963 Grand National.

Ayala entered the 1963 National inexperienced and with a poor record but remarkably as a 66/1 longshot managed a narrow victory ridden by 19-year-old jockey Pat Buckley. Ayala was jointly owned by his trainer, Keith Piggott, father of Lester Piggott, and by Raymond Bessone, the hairdresser also known as Teasy-Weasy. Piggott's father (and Lester's grandfather), Ernie, rode
the winners of the National in 1912 and 1919.

This victory proved to be Ayala's only major win as he fell in both the 1964 and 1965 Nationals.

Grand National record

References

Racehorses trained in the United Kingdom
Grand National winners